The Chancellor of the University of Aberdeen is the titular head of the institution and President of the General Council. The Chancellor is elected by the university's graduate body, the General Council, and the role may be held for life. The main responsibilities of the role are to be an ambassador for the university, and to undertake other ceremonial duties, including conferring degrees on graduands on occasion.

The 11th Chancellor of the university is Her Majesty, The Queen Consort who succeeded The Lord Wilson of Tillyorn in January 2013.

History
The position was created with the amalgamation of the two existing ancient universities in Aberdeen, King's College (est. 1495) and Marischal College (est. 1593) in 1860. Prior to the merge, there were 23 Chancellors of King's College, the majority of whom were Bishops of the diocese, and 12 Chancellors of Marischal College composed equally of Earls Marsichals and Peers.

List of Chancellors of the University of Aberdeen

1861—1903 Charles Gordon-Lennox, 6th Duke of Richmond
1903—1914(?) Donald Smith, 1st Baron Strathcona and Mount Royal
1945—50 Archibald Wavell, 1st Earl Wavell
1951—1965 Rt. Hon Thomas Johnston
1966—1986 Henry Hepburne-Scott, 10th Lord Polwarth
1986—1996 Sir Kenneth Alexander
1997—2013 David Wilson, Baron Wilson of Tillyorn
2013—present Camilla, Queen Consort

List of Chancellors of former constituent colleges

Chancellors of King's College, Aberdeen
1577—1600 David Cunningham, Bishop of Aberdeen
?—? Patrick Forbes, Bishop of Aberdeen
?—? Alexander Forbes, Bishop of Aberdeen
1664—? Patrick Scougal, Bishop of Aberdeen
1827—? George Hamilton-Gordon, 4th Earl of Aberdeen

Chancellors of Marischal College
1761—1792 John Stuart, 3rd Earl of Bute

See also
 Principal of the University of Aberdeen
 Rector of the University of Aberdeen
 Ancient university governance in Scotland

References

External links
 Chancellor | About | The University of Aberdeen

Further reading
 

People associated with the University of Aberdeen